Sulphur Creek may refer to:

Streams
 Sulphur Creek (Alameda County), in California, a tributary of San Lorenzo Creek
 Sulphur Creek (California), a tributary of Aliso Creek in Orange County
 Sulphur Creek (Santa Clara County, California), a tributary of Smith Creek
 Sulphur Creek (Crane Pond Creek), a stream in Missouri
 Sulphur Creek (Cuivre River), a stream in Missouri
 Sulphur Creek (South Dakota)
 Sulphur Creek (Fremont River), a stream in Wayne County, Utah, United States
 Sulphur Creek (Washington), a tributary of the Baker River

Settlements
 Sulphur Creek, Tasmania, a locality in Tasmania, Australia

See also
 Sulphur Spring
 Sulphur Springs (disambiguation)